Niño (Spanish for boy) is a given name, nickname and surname of Spanish origin. The appearance of the surname dates back to medieval Spain, where several prestigious families had the surname, such as the Niño de Guevara family of Bishops from Andalusia, and the Niño brothers, who were involved in the Discovery of the Americas. Because of the popularity of the surname at the time of the colonization, it is now most common in countries such as Colombia, Mexico and Venezuela, while relatively rare in Spain.

The term Niño has also been used as a nickname since at least the 13th century, when the illegitimate son of King Alfonso X was known as "El Niño". The nickname has been especially popular among flamenco singers, such as el Niño de Cabra (1890s), el Niño del Carmen (1900s), el Niño Escacena (1900s), el Niño Genil (1920s), el Niño Ricardo (1930s), el Niño Pérez (1930s), el Niño de Almadén (1950s), el Niño de Málaga (1950s), el Niño de Utrera (1950s), el Niño de Murcia (1950s), el Niño Josele (2000s) and Niño de Elche (2010s). A related word and nickname is nene, by which several people are known, such as Argentine footballer Juan Héctor Guidi, Cuban singer Pedro Lugo and Moroccan drug trafficker Mohamed Taieb Ahmed. The nickname nano (e.g. singer Román León, F1 driver Fernando Alonso) is less common.

Given name
Although rarely used as a forename in Spain or Latin America, Niño is a common name in the Philippines.
Niño del Mar C. Volante, known as Nyoy Volante (born 1978), Filipino entertainer
Niño Martin Eday (born 1993), Filipino mountain bike athlete
Niño Ramírez (1912 – ???), Filipino long jump athlete

Nickname
Francis Alcantara, known as "Niño", (born 1992), Filipino tennis player
Alfonso Fernández el Niño (c. 1243–1281), Spanish nobleman
José Fernández (pitcher), known as "Niño", (1992–2016), Cuban baseball player
Niño Valdés (born Geraldo Ramos Ponciano Valdés) (1924–2001), Cuban boxer
Niño Muhlach (born Angelo Jose Rocha Muhlach, 1971), Filipino actor
Niño de Murcia, Spanish flamenco singer and guitarist
Niño Josele (born Juan José Heredia, 1974), Spanish guitarist
Niño Ricardo (born Manuel Serrapí Sánchez, 1904–1972), Spanish flamenco composer and guitarist
Niño Fidencio (born José Fidencio de Jesús Sintora Constatino, 1898–1938), Mexican curandero
Niño Rivera (born Andrés Echevarría Callava, 1919–1996), Cuban musician

Surname
Alex Niño (born 1940), Filipino comics artist
Andrés Niño (1475 – c. 1530), Spanish navigator
Eduardo Niño (born 1967), Colombian footballer
Edward Niño Hernández (born 1986), Colombian dwarf
Carlos Gabriel Niño (born 1977), American celebrity
Henry Niño (born 1997), Nicaraguan footballer 
Juan Niño (born 1990), Colombian footballer 
José Ferrándiz y Niño (1847–1918), Spanish politician 
Joselyn Alejandra Niño, alias La Flaca, (1990s – 2015), Mexican suspected assassin
Libardo Niño (born 1968), Colombian cyclist 
Miguel Ángel Niño (born 1968), Colombian cyclist
Omar Niño Romero (born 1976), Mexican boxer 
Orlando García Niño (born 1995), Mexican footballer
Pablo Niño (born 1978), Spanish footballer 
Pablo Sánchez Niño (born 1995), Spanish footballer
Pedro Alonso Niño (1455 – c. 1505), Spanish explorer
Pero Niño (1378–1453), Spanish privateer
Rafael Antonio Niño (born 1949), Colombian cyclist
Víctor Niño (born 1973), Colombian cyclist

Double-barreled surnames
Fernando Niño de Guevara (patriarch) (d. 1552), Spanish archbishop
Fernando Niño de Guevara (1541–1609), Spanish cardinal
David Niño de Guzmán (1969–2011), Bolivian journalist and editor
Homero Niño de Rivera (born 1975), Mexican politician
Juan Niño de Tabora (died 1632), Spanish general
Sofia Niño de Rivera (born 1981), Mexican entertainer

See also

Neno (name)
Nilo (name)
Nina (name)
Niña (name)
Nino (name)
Ninos (name)
Nin (surname)
Ning (surname)
Ninho
Nano (disambiguation)
Nono (disambiguation)
Nini (disambiguation)
9 (disambiguation)
NIO (disambiguation)
Niko (disambiguation)

References

Spanish masculine given names
Surnames of Spanish origin
Nicknames